Damman may refer to:

 Dammam, the sixth-most populous city in Saudi Arabia
 Damman (surname)

See also 
 Daman (disambiguation)